Lucius Annaeus Cornutus, a Stoic philosopher, flourished in the reign of Nero (c. 60 AD), when his house in Rome was a school of philosophy.

Life
Cornutus was a native of Leptis Magna in Libya, but resided for the most part in Rome.  He is best known as the teacher and friend of Persius, whose fifth satire is addressed to him, as well as other distinguished students, such as Claudius Agathemerus. "Through Cornutus Persius was introduced to Annaeus, as well as to Lucan, who was of his own age, and also a disciple of Cornutus". At Persius's death, Cornutus returned to Persius' sisters a bequest made to him, but accepted Persius' library of some 700 scrolls. He revised the deceased poet's satires for publication, but handed them over to Caesius Bassus to edit, at the special request of the latter.

Among Persius's satires were lines that, as Suetonius records, "even lashed Nero himself, who was then the reigning prince. The verse ran as follows:

 
 (King Midas has an ass's ears)

but Cornutus altered it to:

 
 Who has not an ass's ears?

in order that it might not be supposed that it was meant to apply to Nero."

Annaeus Cornutus was banished by Nero neverthelessin 66 or 68 ADfor having indirectly disparaged the emperor's projected history of the Romans in heroic verse, after which time nothing more is heard of him.

Writings
Excerpts from his treatise  are preserved in Cassiodorus. A commentary on Virgil is frequently quoted by Servius, but tragedies mentioned by Suetonius have not survived.

Cornutus wrote a work on Rhetoric, and a commentary on the Categories of Aristotle, whose philosophy he attacked along with his fellow Stoic Athenodorus.  He also wrote a work called On Properties.

Compendium of Greek Theology
His one major surviving work, the philosophical treatise,  ("Compendium of Greek Theology") is a manual of "popular mythology as expounded in the etymological and symbolical interpretations of the Stoics". This early example of a Roman educational treatise, provided an account of Greek mythology on the bases of highly elaborated etymological readings. Cornutus sought to recover the earliest beliefs that primitive people had about the world by examining the various names and titles of the gods.  The result, to modern eyes, is often bizarre, with many forced etymologies, as can be seen from the opening paragraph, where Cornutus describes Heaven:
The Heaven [], my boy, encompasses round about the earth and the sea and everything both on the earth and the sea. On this account it has acquired its appellation, since it is an "upper limit" [] of all things and "marks of the bounds" [] of nature. Some say, however, that it is called Heaven [] from its "looking after" [] or "tending to" [] things, that is, from its guarding them, from which also "doorkeeper" [] and "watching carefully" [] are named. Still others derive its etymology from its "being seen above" []. Together with everything it encompasses, it is called the "world" [] from its being "so beautifully ordered" []
The book continues in a similar vein, proceeding from such gods as Zeus, Hera, Cronus, and Poseidon, to the Furies, Fates, Muses, and Graces.  The work is pervaded throughout with a strong undercurrent of Stoic Physics.

We are told that the world has a soul that preserves it called Zeus who dwells in Heaven whose substance is fiery. Zeus is the power that pervades everything, and who assigns Fate to each person. The gods have sent us Reason, which does not work evil, but which is part of the divine Reason of the universe:
"Ocean" is the  that "glides swiftly" and changes continuously, whereas Tethys is the stability of the qualities. For from their blending or mixing come about those things that exist; and nothing would exist if either one unmixed gained the upper hand over the other.

Spurious works
Scholia to Persius are also attributed to Annaeus Cornutus; the latter, however, are of much later date, and are assigned by Jahn to the Carolingian period. The so-called Disticha Cornuti belong to the Late Middle Ages.

In 1891, Johannes Graeven proposed that an anonymous rhetorical treatise (the Anonymous Seguerianus) written in the 3rd century was written by a Cornutus.  This attribution has not been generally accepted and, in any case, would refer to a later Cornutus.

Notes

Further reading
 
 Ramelli, Ilaria (ed.). Anneo Cornuto. Compendio di teologia greca. Milan: Bompiani Il Pensiero Occidentale. 2003. .

1st-century philosophers
1st-century Romans
Philosophers of Roman Italy
Romans from Africa
Roman-era Stoic philosophers
Cornutus, Lucius
Ancient Roman philosophers
Hellenistic writers
Year of birth unknown
Year of death unknown